Callidula dichroa is a moth in the family Callidulidae. It was described by Jean Baptiste Boisduval in 1832. It is found in New Guinea and on Seram and Aru.

References

Callidulidae
Moths described in 1832